Norman Lloyd (1914–2021) was an American actor, producer, and director.

Norman Lloyd may also refer to:
Norman Lloyd (artist) (1895–1983), Australian landscape painter
Norman Lloyd (composer) (1909–1980), American composer and pianist

See also
 Norman Lloyd-Edwards (born 1933), Lord Lieutenant of South Glamorgan (1990 to 2008)